"Eternal Father, Strong to Save" is a British hymn traditionally associated with seafarers, particularly in the maritime armed services. Written in 1860, its author, William Whiting, was inspired by the dangers of the sea described in Psalm 107. It was popularised by the Royal Navy and the United States Navy in the late 19th century, and variations of it were soon adopted by many branches of the armed services in the United Kingdom and the United States. Services who have adapted the hymn include the Royal Marines, Royal Air Force, the British Army, the United States Coast Guard, United States Marine Corps and the United States Space Force, as well as the navies of many Commonwealth realms. Accordingly, it is known by many names, variously referred to as the Hymn of His Majesty's Armed Forces, the Royal Navy Hymn, the United States Navy Hymn (or simply The Navy Hymn), and sometimes by the last line of its first verse, "For Those in Peril on the Sea". The hymn has a long tradition in civilian maritime contexts as well, being regularly invoked by ship's chaplains and sung during services on ocean crossings.

Origin
The original hymn was written in 1860 by William Whiting, an Anglican churchman from Winchester, United Kingdom. Whiting grew up near the ocean on the coasts of England and at the age of thirty-five had felt his life spared by God when a violent storm nearly claimed the ship he was travelling on, instilling a belief in God's command over the rage and calm of the sea. As headmaster of the Winchester College Choristers' School some years later, he was approached by a student about to travel to the United States, who confided in Whiting an overwhelming fear of the ocean voyage. Whiting shared his experiences of the ocean and wrote the hymn to "anchor his faith". In writing it, Whiting is generally thought to have been inspired by Psalm 107, which describes the power and fury of the seas in great detail:

Some went out on the sea in ships; they were merchants on the mighty waters.
They saw the works of the Lord, his wonderful deeds in the deep.
For he spoke and stirred up a tempest that lifted high the waves.
They mounted up to the heavens and went down to the depths; in their peril their courage melted away.Psalm 107: 23–26

Within a year the text appeared in the influential first edition of Hymns Ancient and Modern (HA&M) in 1861 (the setting is reproduced below) and its circulation became widespread throughout England. The text was substantially revised by the compilers of that edition. In response Whiting continued to revise his own text, releasing another version in 1869 and a third in 1874, the last one incorporating most of the suggested changes by HA&M.

Meanwhile, John B. Dykes, an Anglican clergyman, composed the tune "Melita", in 88 88 88 iambic meter, to accompany the HA&M version of 1861. Dykes was a well-known composer of nearly three hundred hymn tunes, many of which are still in use today. "Melita" is an archaic term for Malta, an ancient seafaring nation which was then a colony of the British Empire, and is now a member of the Commonwealth of Nations. It was the site of a shipwreck, mentioned in Acts of the Apostles (chapters 27–28), involving the Apostle Paul.

The original words of the 1861 version are:
Eternal Father, strong to save,
Whose arm hath bound the restless wave,
Who bid'st the mighty ocean deep
Its own appointed limits keep;
O hear us when we cry to Thee,
For those in peril on the sea.

O Christ, Whose voice the waters heard
And hushed their raging at Thy word,
Who walkedst on the foaming deep,
And calm amidst its rage didst sleep;
O hear us when we cry to Thee,
For those in peril on the sea.
Most Holy Spirit, Who didst brood
Upon the chaos dark and rude,
And bid its angry tumult cease,
And give, for wild confusion, peace;
O hear us when we cry to Thee,
For those in peril on the sea!

O Trinity of love and power,
Our brethren shield in danger's hour;
From rock and tempest, fire and foe,
Protect them wheresoe'er they go;
Thus evermore shall rise to Thee
Glad hymns of praise from land and sea.

Amen.

The first verse refers to God the Father forbidding the waters to flood the earth as described in Psalm 104. The second verse refers to Jesus' miracles of stilling a storm and walking on the waters of the Sea of Galilee. The third verse references the Holy Spirit's role in the creation of the earth in the Book of Genesis, while the final verse is a reference to Psalm 107.

Navy use
The adoption of the hymn for devotional use and benedictions in the armed services was first recorded in 1879. In that year, Lieutenant Commander Charles Jackson Train was a navigation instructor at the United States Naval Academy at Annapolis and the master of the Midshipman Choir. Train began the practice of concluding Divine Services with the 1861 version of the hymn every Sunday, whereby it eventually became an academy, and then a service-wide, tradition, becoming known as the Navy Hymn. The lyrics were altered to suit changes in the culture and technology of the navy. Additional variants have been written, often to specifically represent a particular branch of naval service.

Adoption of the hymn by the Royal Navy may have occurred earlier than its use in the United States. Although no clear records exist for its first use, the hymn was in widespread use by the 1890s in the Royal Navy. An extra verse was added during World War I to reflect the introduction of the Royal Naval Air Service. The result today is a hymn somewhat different from its American counterpart, with the optional verse for specific service branches being sung between the second and third verses.

Multiservice rewording
In 1940, the US Episcopal Church altered three verses of the hymn to include travel on the land in the second verse (referencing Psalm 50) and in the air in the third verse (again referencing Genesis). This was published as Hymn No. 513 while the original lyrics were also published as Hymn No. 512 in The Hymnal 1940. The Hymnal 1982, which is in current use by most Episcopal congregations in the US, has further revised this version
(as Hymn #579) with opening line "Almighty Father, strong to save..." by adding the word "space" to the final verse, so it ends "Glad praise from space, air, land, and sea", acknowledging the possibility of space travel. The Hymnal also has a more traditional water-only version (as Hymn #608) with opening line "Eternal Father, strong to save..." The 1940 version—incorporating sea, land, and air is:

Almighty Father, strong to save,
Whose arm hath bound the restless wave,
Who bidd'st the mighty ocean deep
Its own appointed limits keep:
O hear us when we cry to thee
For those in peril on the sea.

O Christ, the Lord of hill and plain
O'er which our traffic runs amain
By mountain pass or valley low;
Wherever, Lord, thy brethren go,
Protect them by thy guarding hand
From every peril on the land.
O Spirit, whom the Father sent
To spread abroad the firmament;
O Wind of heaven, by thy might
Save all who dare the eagle's flight,
And keep them by thy watchful care
From every peril in the air.

O Trinity of love and power,
Our brethren shield in danger's hour;
From rock and tempest, fire and foe,
Protect them wheresoe'er they go,
Thus evermore shall rise to thee
Glad praise from air and land and sea.

Other variants

Several additional or variant verses are in use in the US military services, including the US Marines, US Navy Seabees, submariners and US Coast Guard.

Notable uses
The hymn appears in many hymnals, including the Army and Navy Hymnal, which was used by American forces during World War II, and the New English Hymnal. The tune is also sometimes used for the text "Lord God of Hosts, within whose hand", written by Laurence Housman for the 1906 English Hymnal.

It features as the climax of Benjamin Britten's staged cantata for church performance, Noye's Fludde (1958). At the height of the storm, accompanied by the same ostinato in the bass that has built up to this point, the cast sings the first verse in unison (Noye an octave lower). They are joined by the audience/congregation in the second verse. The third verse is accompanied by an organ instead of the orchestra, the boys of the cast singing a descant while everyone else sings in unison.

It was among those sung on 9 August 1941, at a church service aboard the Royal Navy battleship  attended by Winston Churchill (who requested that the hymn be sung) and Franklin D. Roosevelt at the conference creating the Atlantic Charter. It was however sung later that day by second-class passengers in a musical prayer service.

Owing to its nautical theme, this hymn has been played or sung at a number of funerals for those who have served in or been associated with the Royal Navy or US Navy. Most notably, it was sung at the funerals of the Earl Mountbatten of Burma, Prince Philip, Duke of Edinburgh, and of multiple US presidents, including Roosevelt, Richard Nixon, George H. W. Bush and John F. Kennedy.

References

Sources

External links

"Eternal Father, Strong to Save" at CyberHymnal
US Navy FAQ on the Navy Hymn

1860 songs
Patriotic hymns
British patriotic songs
English Christian hymns
Royal Navy traditions
American patriotic songs
United States Navy traditions
19th-century hymns